For information on all Fairfield University sports, see Fairfield Stags

The Fairfield Stags football program were the intercollegiate American football team for Fairfield University located in Fairfield, Connecticut. The team competed in the NCAA Division I-AA and were members of the Metro Atlantic Athletic Conference. The school's first football team was fielded in 1996. Fairfield participated in football from 1996 to 2002, compiling an all-time record of 44–28. The Fairfield football program was discontinued at the conclusion of the 2002 season.

Notable former players
Notable alumni include: Kevin Nealon, Steve Norcini, Alex Warr, Mike "Papa" Erwin, “High School” Bob Hoey and David Strada. Ben McAdoo was an assistant coach during the 2002 (final) season.

Year-by-year results

Championships

Conference championships

References

 
American football teams established in 1996
American football teams disestablished in 2002
1996 establishments in Connecticut
2002 disestablishments in Connecticut